Look After Lulu! is a farce by Noël Coward, based on Occupe-toi d'Amélie! by Georges Feydeau. It is set in Paris in 1908. The central character is an attractive cocotte, Lulu, whose lover is called away on military service; the plot involves libidinous foreign royalty, a mock wedding that turns out to be real, people hiding under beds and in bathrooms, and a happy ending.

The play premiered in 1959 on Broadway and then played in London later the same year. It was revived in the West End in 1978 and has been adapted for television.

Background
Although French farces, including those of Georges Feydeau, had been adapted for the London stage since Victorian times, his name was not widely familiar to London theatregoers until the 1950s. In 1956 Jean-Louis Barrault and his wife Madeleine Renaud had brought their production of Occupe-toi d'Amélie! ("Take Care of Amélie") to London, where it was enthusiastically received. No English version of the text had been published, and Barrault and Renaud suggested to Laurence Olivier and Vivien Leigh that they ask Coward to adapt the play.

With the help of his assistant, Cole Lesley, Coward worked on the script in the summer of 1958. He noted in his diary for 22 June:

Leigh was not immediately available to play the central role, and Coward therefore decided to open the play in America first. His first choice to play Lulu was Shirley MacLaine, who was not available because of filming commitments. His second choice was Carol Channing:

Cyril Ritchard, who was to direct the production, and Roddy McDowall, cast as the male lead, suggested Tammy Grimes, who had not done a Broadway "book" show; Coward saw her cabaret act and immediately offered her the role.

After a tryout in New Haven, Connecticut, the play premiered on Broadway at the Henry Miller's Theatre on 3 March 1959 and closed on 4 April 1959 after 39 performances. Look After Lulu! opened in London on 29 July 1959, at the Royal Court Theatre, Chelsea, and transferred to the West End at the New Theatre (later renamed the Noël Coward Theatre), where it ran until December 1959, a total of 155 performances.  It was directed by Tony Richardson.

Original casts

Plot

Act I

Lulu's apartment in Paris, 1908
Lulu is entertaining friends when Philippe, her lover, arrives. He has been summoned to do his statutory fortnight of military service and is nervous about leaving Lulu alone. They are interrupted by the arrival of Claire, Duchess of Clausonnes. She is in love with Philippe's best friend, Marcel; she has seen a letter in which Marcel announces that he is going to marry Lulu. Marcel arrives and explains that the letter was a ruse to fool his rich godfather, Herr Van Putzeboum, who is certain to make him a generous settlement if he marries (or seems to). Van Putzeboum is expected to arrive at any moment, and Marcel persuades Lulu take part in a bogus wedding ceremony, in return for ten per cent of the fortune.

Before Van Putzeboum arrives, another visitor is announced: General Koschnadieff, the emissary of Prince Nicholas of Palestria. The Prince is an admirer of Lulu and the General has come to arrange an assignation. At this moment Marcel rushes in to say that his godfather is arriving. Koschnadieff leaves, saying he will return shortly for Lulu's answer. Van Putzeboum enters and is enchanted with Lulu. He sees that the flowers he ordered have not yet been delivered, and he goes out to chivvy the florist.

Philippe reluctantly agrees to the pretended marriage of Marcel and Lulu but confides his concerns about Lulu and other men. He asks Marcel to look after her while he is away. Van Putzboum returns with the flowers and dead-heats with the Prince, who assumes the flowers are to greet his arrival.

Act 2

Marcel's bedroom, some days later
Marcel wakes up with a hangover to find to his horror that the bump in the bed next to him is not, as he assumed, his pet dog, but is Lulu. She has no idea how she got there the previous night and neither has Marcel. She writes a note to her father asking him to bring her some daytime clothes in which she can walk home. Marcel receives a letter from his godfather, to announce a surprise dinner party for the engaged couple. This is not what Lulu has in mind: her assignation with Prince is a more appealing prospect. She writes him a note. The note is accidentally put in the envelope addressed to her father, and the letter intended for him is put in the one addressed to the Prince.

Claire arrives to see Marcel. Lulu hides under the bed, where she pretends to be a mouse until Claire finally flees. Lulu climbs back into the bed – just as Van Putzeboum enters to discover what he assumes is the engaged couple indulging in a little premarital familiarity. Lulu's father arrives with the news that Philippe has returned early from his military duties and is expected at any moment. There arrive, in short order, the Prince, Van Putzeboum and Philippe. The first two in turn take refuge in the bathroom as the next new arrival comes in.

Philippe concludes that Marcel and Lulu have deceived him and determines to be revenged. He pretends to know an actor who would be willing to impersonate the Mayor and conduct the mock marriage service between Lulu and Marcel. The Prince emerges from the bathroom and demands to know what is going on. Lulu explains:

Act 3

Scene 1: The Registrar's Office in the Town Hall
All Lulu's friends are present. The Mayor enters and those who are in on the deception comment on Toto's remarkable impersonation of the real Mayor. The ceremony over, Lulu is anxious to leave for her assignation with the Prince. Philippe reveals to Marcel that there was no impersonation: the real Mayor has just conducted a valid ceremony and Marcel and Lulu are man and wife. Marcel faints. On discovering the truth Claire too faints.

Scene 2: Lulu's apartment, later that day
The Prince is waiting for Lulu in her bedroom. As she steps out of her dress and into his embrace, Marcel arrives to break the news that the "mock" wedding was in fact real. Lulu is not impressed that he is so horrified at being married to her: "I can't see why you should be so against the idea: I'm sound in wind and limb, and fairly popular". Realising that she is now married, she puts her clothes back on. Marcel throws the Prince's clothes out of the bedroom window, locks the two of them in and rushes to the local police station, returning with an inspector to witness the Prince and Lulu in flagrante delicto (or in Così fan tutte as the Prince calls it). The inspector, citing diplomatic immunity, refuses to take action against royalty travelling incognito. As he leaves, Philippe enters and Marcel makes a second attempt. As the Prince is still without trousers, Marcel produces a revolver and makes Philippe take off his trousers and give them to the Prince, who then leaves. As he does so, the inspector returns with a gift of flowers for Lulu. Seeing a trouserless man who is clearly not royalty, he is happy to act as a witness.

The marriage can be annulled. Philippe is persuaded that Marcel and Lulu have not betrayed him. As he and Lulu become affectionate, Marcel leaves, blowing them both a kiss and bidding Philippe "Look after Lulu!"

Source: Mander and Mitchenson.

Critical reception
In The Daily News, John Chapman thought the elaborate décor by Cecil Beaton and a too strenuous attempt to be funny on the part of some of the cast weighed the piece down. In The New York Times, Brooks Atkinson praised the wit of Coward's dialogue, but found an excess of "horseplay … the exuberance of the cast does not evoke exuberance in the audience".

When the play opened in London, the notices for the cast and production were better, but the play was generally felt to have been only partly successful. The New York Times quoted a London critic:  "I came away reflecting that Noel Coward is Noel Coward, French farce is French farce, and never the twain should meet." Harold Hobson in The Sunday Times concurred: "If Look After Lulu! is only half a success, the reasons are more than complimentary to everyone concerned. The trouble is that Mr Coward is too witty, and Miss Leigh too beautiful. For the kind of play that Look After Lulu! is, beauty and wit are about as necessary as a peach melba at the North Pole".

Revivals and adaptations
The play was revived at the Chichester Festival in 1978 in a production by Patrick Garland, which transferred to the Haymarket Theatre, London, where it ran for 56 performances. Geraldine McEwan played Lulu, with Clive Francis as Marcel and Gary Raymond as Philippe.

Brian Rix and his company presented a televised version of the play in 1967, with Rix as Marcel, Elspet Gray as Lulu and Anton Rogers as Philippe.

Notes, references and sources

Notes

References

Sources

External links
Internet Broadway Database listing
cast list

Plays by Noël Coward
1959 plays
Fiction set in 1908
Plays set in France